Protesilaus telesilaus is a species of butterfly of the genus Protesilaus. It is native to the Americas.

Subspecies
P. t. telesilaus (Colombia, Venezuela, Brazil: Amazonas, Espírito Santo, Rio de Janeiro)
P. t. dolius (Rothschild & Jordan, 1906) (Panama, Colombia)
P. t. salobrensis (d'Almeida, 1941) (Brazil: Mato Grosso)
P. t. vitellus Fruhstorfer, 1907 (Brazil: Paraná, Santa Catarina)

References
 

Lewis, H. L., 1974 Butterflies of the World  Page 23, figure 14.

External links

 
BOA Images of types

Butterflies described in 1864
Papilionidae
Papilionidae of South America
Taxa named by Baron Cajetan von Felder
Taxa named by Rudolf Felder